Shveta Salve is an Indian television actress and model, best known as the 1st runner-up of the dance reality show Jhalak Dikhhla Jaa 1.

Early life and education
Born in Chembur, Mumbai to Deepak and Hema Salve, sister of Sharvil. She studied in Loreto Convent School in Chembur and graduated with a BA degree from Sophia College, Mumbai.
She displayed her talent in school dramas and dance performances. In her college festival Shveta won the title of Miss Kaleidoscope.

Career

Shveta was one of the main actors in Hip Hip Hurray, a television serial on Zee TV in 1998 and 2001. Shweta acted in TV serials like Lipstick and Saarrkar, but she became popular in her role as Dr Ritu Mishra in Left Right Left on SAB TV. She made her feature film debut with Pyaar Mein Kabhi Kabhi (1999), which was also the feature film debut of host of actors including, Rinke Khanna, Sanjay Suri, Dino Morea and Akashdeep Saigal, though the film didn't do well at the box office. She later appeared in TV series like Kittie Party, Saarrkar, Kahin Kissi Roz and a brief role in Jassi Jaisi Koi Nahin.

She participated in the first season of popular dance show Jhalak Dikhhla Jaa (2006). She paired with the choreographer Longinus Fernandes and was the runner up. In 2007, she appeared as host of TV sports reality series, Cricket Star. She appeared on the cover of the April 2008 issue of Maxim India magazine.

She participated in the second season of the famous reality show of Indian television Khatron Ke Khiladi (Season 2), Indian version of Fear Factor as a participant.

She also performed an item number in the 2011 film Dil Toh Baccha Hai Ji and the 2011 film Lanka.

Personal life
She married her long-time boyfriend Hermit Sethi on 24 April 2012. She has a baby girl, born 2016

Filmography

Television shows

References

External links

 

Female models from Mumbai
Indian film actresses
Living people
Marathi people
Sophia College for Women alumni
Participants in Indian reality television series
Indian television actresses
Indian soap opera actresses
Indian women television presenters
Indian television presenters
Actresses in Hindi television
21st-century Indian actresses
20th-century Indian actresses
Fear Factor: Khatron Ke Khiladi participants
Year of birth missing (living people)